Helma Notte (22 September 1911 – 14 March 1997) was a German athlete. She competed in the women's high jump at the 1928 Summer Olympics and the 1932 Summer Olympics.

References

1911 births
1997 deaths
Athletes (track and field) at the 1928 Summer Olympics
Athletes (track and field) at the 1932 Summer Olympics
German female high jumpers
Olympic athletes of Germany
Sportspeople from Düsseldorf
Women's World Games medalists